Two human polls made up the 2014–15 NCAA Division I men's ice hockey rankings, the USCHO.com/CBS College Sports poll and the USA Today/USA Hockey Magazine poll. As the 2014–15 season progressed, rankings were updated weekly.

Legend

USCHO

USA Today

References
USCHO.com Division I Men's Poll
http://www.uscho.com/rankings/d-i-mens-poll/
USA Today/USA Hockey Magazine Men's College Hockey Poll

External links
USA Today/USA Hockey Magazine Men's College Hockey Poll
USCHO.com/CBS College Sports Division I Men's Poll

rankings
College men's ice hockey rankings in the United States